Doug Routley (born May 9, 1961) is the current MLA for Nanaimo-North Cowichan in the Canadian province of British Columbia. He was first elected to the Legislative Assembly in the riding of Cowichan-Ladysmith in the 2005 general election and then to the riding of Nanaimo-North Cowichan after new electoral districts were established for the 2009 general election.

He is a member of the British Columbia New Democratic Party.

In 2018, during legislative debate on new policies around sexual orientation and gender identity in the provincial education system, Routley came out as bisexual.

Electoral results

References

British Columbia New Democratic Party MLAs
Living people
1961 births
21st-century Canadian politicians
British Columbia school board members
Canadian male cyclists
Canadian loggers
Canadian trade unionists
Janitors
Teachers of English as a second or foreign language
United Steelworkers people
Canadian LGBT people in provincial and territorial legislatures
Bisexual politicians
Bisexual men
21st-century Canadian LGBT people